Operation Agneepath is a Bangladeshi action thriller film directed by Ashiqur Rahman, produced under the banner of Vertex Production and Cinefekt Entertainment. It stars Shakib Khan, Shiba Ali Khan, Sayelaluddin Mahalder And Misha Sawdagor in lead roles. This film has been music composed by Dabbu Ghosal, Akassh and Imran Mahmudul.

The film centers around Major Shehzad Khan, a Secret Service Bangladesh agent, tasked with assassinating Zulfiqer Mirza, who is planning to undertake a massive terrorist attack in Bangladesh. The plot of the film builds around SSB espionage operation, and assassination of Zulfiqer Mirza in Australia. Principal photography began in September 2016, in Sydney, Australia. The film was slated to release on 23 December 2017, but did not release.

Cast
 Shakib Khan as Captain Shehzad Khan Rana
Shiba Ali Khan as Raima
 Misha Sawdagor as Zulfiqer Mirza
 Tiger Robi as ex "Capt" Afgan
 Taskeen Rahman
 Sayelaluddin Mahalder, (Indian West Bengal film actor)

Soundtrack

References

External links
 

Unreleased Bangladeshi films
Bengali-language Bangladeshi films
Bangladeshi action thriller films
Films scored by Dabbu
Films scored by Ali Akram Shuvo
Films scored by Akassh
Films scored by Aryan Ashik
Films scored by Imran Mahmudul